Henry J. Clasen (February 10, 1829 – September 29, 1907) was an American businessman and politician.

Born in Mecklenburg-Schwerin, Germany, Clasen went to Quebec, Canada and then went to Milwaukee, Wisconsin. He then settled in Brookfield, Wisconsin where he operated a sawmill, a farm, and a store. He served as postmaster. In 1874, Clasen served in the Wisconsin State Assembly and was a Democrat. He also served as county treasurer for Waukesha County, Wisconsin. Clasen died in Waukesha, Wisconsin.

Notes

1829 births
1907 deaths
German emigrants to the United States
People from Brookfield, Wisconsin
Businesspeople from Wisconsin
Farmers from Wisconsin
County officials in Wisconsin
Wisconsin postmasters
19th-century American politicians
Democratic Party members of the Wisconsin State Assembly